Mahrail is a village in the Madhubani district in Bihar, India. Mahrail is one of the 48 villages of the Andhratharhi Block of Madhubani district. According to the government register, the village population is 30,800 with 3,526 houses.

Mahrail is situated on the banks of the Kamala River. There are several schools in the village. National Highway 57 passes through the village. Jhanjharpur is near to the village ( from Mahrail station). Railways and bus facilities are available to reach the village. 

Mahrail is well-known for its cultural activities, such as the Durga Puja festival.

Population 

Mahrail's population is 30,800, with 15,200 males and 15,600 females. The village has 4,280 children in the age between 0–6 years, where 2,612 are boys and 2,315 are girls.

Literacy 

The literacy rate in Mahrail village is 78%. Of the total population of 30,800, 24,024 are literate. The literacy rate for males is 70% and the literacy rate for females is 68%.

Schools:

 Aadya Devi Prathmik Sah Madhya Sanskrit School
 P L K Sanstrit high School Mahrail Rajkiya Madhya Vidyalaya Primary School
 Rajkiya Uchya High School

College:

 Kirti narayan Kamakhya Sanskrit Mahavidyalaya Mahrail

Employment 

Employed individuals make up 71% of the village where 5% of the total population are completely reliant on farming. The major of the population is involved in agricultural activities.

Villages in Madhubani district